The Presidential Archives and Leadership Library (formerly, the Presidential Museum) is a museum and library complex located at 4919 East University Blvd. in Odessa, Texas, on the campus of the University of Texas of the Permian Basin.

History
After fighting financial hardships, the Presidential Museum temporarily closed its doors to the public from August 2009 to February 2010. Eventually, the contents of the Presidential Museum, including the library, were transferred to UTPB in 2011, and the facility was reopened to researchers and the public as the Presidential Archives and Leadership Library. The Presidential Museum, now doing business as the "Friends of the Presidential Archives," is nonprofit corporation, formed in the State of Texas in September 1978, and exempt from taxation under section 501 (c) (3).

Gallery

References

External links

Presidential Museum and Leadership Library

Library buildings completed in 1969
Presidential libraries
University of Texas Permian Basin
Organizations established in 1965
Presidential museums in Texas
Museums in Ector County, Texas
Odessa, Texas